Gašper Kopitar (born 13 August 1992), is a Slovenian former professional ice hockey player who last played with the Manchester Monarchs of the ECHL. He is the younger brother of Anže Kopitar, who currently plays for the Los Angeles Kings of the National Hockey League.

Playing career
Kopitar was born in Jesenice, to Matjaž and Mateja Kopitar. In his youth, Kopitar played for the youth team of his hometown, HK Acroni Jesenice. In 2008, he moved to the USA and played the rest of his junior years there. On 25 April 2012, he began his senior career when he signed a contract in Europe with Swedish club Mora IK of the HockeyAllsvenskan. In December 2013 he signed a contract with the Ontario Reign of the ECHL. Kopitar scored his first goal with the Reign on 5 January 2014 against the San Francisco Bulls, winning the game 3-2 in overtime.

On 1 October 2014, Kopitar agreed to return to the Reign, signing a standard player contract for the 2014–15 season.

On 28 July 2015, Kopitar remained within the Los Angeles Kings' ECHL affiliate, signing a one-year contract with the Manchester Monarchs.

Kopitar remained within the Kings' ECHL affiliates through parts of six seasons. Suffering from prolonged injury, which ruled him out of the entire 2017–18 season, Kopitar returned to play in 7 games in the following 2018–19 season before opting to end his professional career and announce his immediate retirement on 5 December 2018.

International play
Kopitar played in his first senior tournament for his country in 2013, when he participated in the Olympic Qualifying Tournament, which Slovenia won.

Career statistics

Regular season and playoffs

International

References

External links

1992 births
Living people
Des Moines Buccaneers players
Ethnic Slovene people
Manchester Monarchs (ECHL) players
Mora IK players
Ontario Reign (ECHL) players
Portland Winterhawks players
Slovenian ice hockey left wingers
Sportspeople from Jesenice, Jesenice
Slovenian expatriate ice hockey people
Slovenian expatriate sportspeople in the United States
Slovenian expatriate sportspeople in Sweden
Expatriate ice hockey players in the United States
Expatriate ice hockey players in Sweden